Agapa is an Old Church Slavonic and rare Russian female first name. It is derived from the Greek word agapē, meaning love.

The diminutives of "Agapa" are Aga and Gapa.

"Agapa" may also be a diminutive of the female name Agapiya.

References

Notes

Sources
[1] А. В. Суперанская (A. V. Superanskaya). "Современный словарь личных имён: Сравнение. Происхождение. Написание" (Modern Dictionary of First Names: Comparison. Origins. Spelling). Айрис-пресс. Москва, 2005. 
[2] А. В. Суперанская (A. V. Superanskaya). "Словарь русских имён" (Dictionary of Russian Names). Издательство Эксмо. Москва, 2005. 
Н. А. Петровский (N. A. Petrovsky). "Словарь русских личных имён" (Dictionary of Russian First Names). ООО Издательство "АСТ". Москва, 2005. 

